The Randolph–Macon Yellow Jackets are the athletic teams that represent Randolph–Macon College, located in Ashland, Virginia, in NCAA Division III intercollegiate sports. The Yellow Jackets compete as members of the Old Dominion Athletic Conference. Altogether, Randolph–Macon sponsors 18 sports, with 9 teams for each gender. The school's newest sport of men's volleyball, introduced for the 2019 season (2018–19 school year), is the only team that does not compete in the ODAC, instead competing in the Continental Volleyball Conference. (The only other ODAC members with men's volleyball programs are Eastern Mennonite and Roanoke, both schools are also CVC members.)

History
The school's main rival in men's sports over the past century has been Hampden–Sydney College. The football game between Randolph–Macon and Hampden–Sydney dates to the 19th century and is billed as the "Oldest Small-College Rivalry in the South". Randolph–Macon won the first contest 12–6 in 1893.  Randolph–Macon was also a founding member of the Virginia Intercollegiate Athletic Association in 1900, and remained in the organization until 1921, when the association dissolved.

On November 24, 2020, the 1984 football victory over Hampden Sydney was voted the greatest football game in the history of Randolph Macon dating back to 1891. In this game, Randolph Macon’s defense forced five turnovers which allowed the explosive and record breaking offense to score 31 points in a 31–10 victory. This win allowed Randolph Macon to advance to the NCAA playoffs for the first time in the school’s history finishing the regular season ranked #5 in the nation and #1 in the NCAA South Region.    During the historic 1984 season, Randolph Macon wide receiver Keith Gilliam broke the all time NCAA record by having nine consecutive receptions for touchdowns.

Varsity teams

List of teams

Men's sports
 Baseball
 Basketball
 Football
 Golf
 Lacrosse
 Soccer
 Swimming
 Tennis
 Volleyball

Women's sports
 Basketball
 Field Hockey
 Golf
 Lacrosse
 Soccer
 Softball
 Swimming
 Tennis
 Volleyball

Individual teams

Football

In 1969 Randolph–Macon defeated the University of Bridgeport (Connecticut) 47–28 in the inaugural Knute Rockne Bowl laying claim to a shared College Division II National Championship with Wittenberg University (Springfield, Ohio) which had defeated William Jewell College in the first Amos Alonzo Stagg Bowl. The 4 teams had been chosen by the NCAA to compete in the first ever playoffs established for Division II schools. No complete playoff was set up until 1973. The 1969 football team was inducted into the college's Hall of Fame in 2004. The 1968 team with a perfect 9–0 record remains the only undefeated and untied football team in school history. The Yellow Jacket football team is currently coached by Pedro Arruza and won the ODAC championship in 2008, 2016 and 2018.

On November 24, 2020, the 1984 football victory over Hampden Sydney was voted the greatest football game in the history of Randolph Macon dating back to 1891.  In this game, Randolph Macon’s defense forced five turnovers which allowed the explosive and record breaking offense to score 31 points in a 31–10 victory.  This win allowed Randolph Macon Macon to advance to the NCAA playoffs for the first time in the school’s history finishing the regular season ranked #5 in the nation and #1 in the NCAA South Region. During the historic 1984 season, Randolph Macon wide receiver Keith Gilliam broke the all time NCAA record by having nine consecutive receptions for touchdowns.

As of Nov 2013 the football team had posted a record 7 seasons with a winning record under Coach Arruza. The football team plays its home games at Day Field.

Basketball
Randolph–Macon's basketball teams have had numerous successful seasons. The women's basketball team played in the NCAA Division III national championship game in the 2004–05 season, losing to Millikin University and finishing second in the nation. The men's basketball team has been ranked #1 in the country by D3hoops.com, most recently in the 2014–15 season, and earned a trip to the Final Four of the NCAA Division III tournament in 2010.  The men's basketball program has made 24 NCAA tournament appearances while the women have appeared in 11 NCAA tournaments.

Because of the truncated 2020–21 basketball season, the men's program was also de facto media-crowned national champions in a season when the NCAA did not hold a tournament because of an insufficient number of schools playing the season by participating in an organised pre-2014 college football-style national championship game as the No. 1 ranked team in D3Sports.com's polls against No. 2 Trine University, winning the game 69–55. The following season, the Yellow Jackets compiled a record of 33–1 and won the 2022 NCAA Division III Tournament, defeating 16th ranked Elmhurst 75–45 in the final. All-American Buzz Anthony earned the tournament's Most Outstanding Player award.

Women's volleyball
R–MC won its fifth overall ODAC title and made its sixth NCAA appearance in 2016. In 2015 the team made an appearance in the Elite 8.

Baseball
The school's baseball team have won the ODAC championship in 1979, 1987, 2008, 2011, 2013 and 2016. In the 2016 season, R–MC reached the Mideast Regional title game. The Yellow Jackets won the South Regional Championship in 2018 and made their first appearance at the College World Series in Appleton, Wisconsin.

References

External links